G. ehrenbergii may refer to:

 Galium ehrenbergii, a herbaceous plant
 Gliricidia ehrenbergii, an ornamental tree